Esporte Clube Macapá, commonly referred to as Macapá, is a Brazilian football club based in Macapá, Amapá. The team competes in the Campeonato Amapaense, the top division in the Amapá state football league system.

It was founded on 7 September 1941. Macapá had a historic rivalry with Amapá Clube, with whom they played the Clássico Vovô. 

As of 2022, Macapá is the third-best ranked team from Amapá in CBF's national club ranking, being placed 205th overall.

History
On July 18, 1944, the club was founded as Panair Esporte Clube, by Emanuel de Souza.

In 1946, the club was renamed to its current name, Esporte Clube Macapá.

In 1992, Macapá disputed the Campeonato Brasileiro Série C. The club was eliminated in the first stage, finishing in the third position (out of five clubs) of its group.

Honours

Regional 

 Torneio de Integração da Amazônia
 Champions: 1975

State 

 Campeonato Amapaense
 Champions (17): 1944, 1946, 1947, 1948, 1954, 1955, 1956, 1957, 1958, 1959, 1969, 1974, 1978, 1980, 1981, 1986, 1991
 Runners-up (3): 1994, 2013, 2017

 Campeonato Amapaense Segunda Divisão
 Champions: 1989
 Runners-up: 2005
Campeonato Amapaense U20
 Runners-up: 2021

Stadium

Like other clubs in the state, Macapá does not have its own stadium. Since 2017, all football matches in Amapá are held at Zerão. Up until 2014, the team also played at Glicerão, which is currently undergoing renovation.

Home kit
Esporte Clube Macapá's home kit is a blue shirt, with white shorts and white socks.

Logo
Macapá's logo inspiration is the Brazilian flag. It is a blue circle, with five white stars of different sizes and a curved white band running through it. The club's name E.C. Macapá is inscribed in capital letters in blue inside the band.

Notes

References

Further reading

External links 

Association football clubs established in 1944
Football clubs in Amapá
1944 establishments in Brazil
Macapá